The Shoes of the Fisherman may refer to: 

 The Shoes of the Fisherman (novel), a 1963 novel by the writer Morris West
 The Shoes of the Fisherman (film), a 1968 film based on the novel